Nibedita Pradhan is an Indian politician who served as Member of Odisha Legislative Assembly from Cuttack Sadar Assembly constituency.

Personal life 
She was born on 7 July 1963.

References 

Living people
1963 births
Women members of the Odisha Legislative Assembly